The Central District of Torbat-e Jam County is a district (bakhsh) in Torbat-e Jam County, Razavi Khorasan Province, Iran. At the 2006 census, its population was 123,799, in 27,981 families.  The District has one city: Torbat-e Jam. The District has three rural districts (dehestan): Jamrud Rural District, Jolgeh-ye Musaabad Rural District, and Mian Jam Rural District.

References 

Districts of Razavi Khorasan Province
Torbat-e Jam County